Fly Me to Polaris is a 1999 Hong Kong romantic fantasy film directed by Jingle Ma and starring Richie Jen and Cecilia Cheung.

Plot
The plots focuses on the character Onion (Jen) who became blind and mute during his childhood. Onion works at a hospital transcribing documents into braille for blind patients. His work allows him to live in the hospital dorm and get health checks from Dr. Woo (So). We learn that Onion always gets his haircut by Autumn (Cheung) whose first impression was full of apologies for being late and she was very clumsy. One time, she accidentally cut Onion's ear, but Onion never got mad. Instead he tried to console her and joke with her.  Gradually they became close and Autumn gave Onion his nickname "Onion" because after the haircut, she said he looks like an onion head. One day, Onion and Autumn were hanging out on the rooftop of the hospital and she told Onion excitedly about a meteor shower that is about to happen in a few days and how they should each make a wish. Onion later accompanied Autumn back to the dormitories for her to get ready for her night shift. Before parting, Onion asks Autumn out on a date and when she says yes, he becomes really happy. He trips over a rock running into the street and is hit by a car. The death of Onion made Autumn realize that she was really deeply in love with him.

Because he was the 6 billionth human to die and depart to Polaris, Onion is granted a wish. He wishes to return to Earth. But there's a limit of five days. Unfortunately the rules stipulate that he cannot tell anyone who he really is and that, at the same time, his face will be different, so he will not be recognized as Onion by his former friends.
 
Upon returning to Earth, Onion wakes up in the storage of the same hospital he used to work at. After changing into overalls, Onion sets out exploring the hospital grounds taking in the sights. Finally able to speak to his colleagues, Onion soon learns from a nurse that Autumn has left the grounds to attend the funeral of a dear friend. That dear friend turns out to be Onion himself. At the funeral, Onion sees an inconsolable Autumn with Dr. Woo by her side. After the funeral, Onion discovers an insurance broker's business card in his secret storage in his dorm. THe name on the card reads "Cheuk Ji Mun". Posing as Cheuk Ji Mun, a life insurance broker, Onion tries to get close to Autumn again by posing as a friend of Onion. But his approach is all wrong and only gets Autumn mad at him. When he finds her being courted by Dr. Woo, he wastes a few days trying to tell her who he really is, even writing a card and voice recording himself, but the rules keep stopping him with epileptic effects, a smudged out card, and an empty recording. Just when he was about to give up, he discovers that he can share his memories with Autumn indirectly by narrating Onion's life story via Onion's diary. But that ended up hurting Autumn more as her memories about Onion come flooding back overwhelming her. Onion then makes the most of the time he has remaining with her by being her guardian angel, secretly helping her with hospital duties, loading her grocery cart with her favourite candy, and serenading her with his saxophone outside her dorm window just like he has always done in the past. His action made Autumn feel like Onion has come back to her. But where is he?
 
Towards the end of Onion's stay, Autumn slowly realizes that he is Onion. But by that time, there are only few minutes left until the meteor showers, flying him back to Polaris.

Cast
 Richie Jen as Onion / Cheuk
 Cecilia Cheung as Autumn Yue
 William So as Dr. Woo
 Eric Tsang as Jumboball
 Eric Kot as Angel
 Sheren Tang as Autumn's sister
 Sandy Lamb as Radio program host
 Isabel Chan as Nurse Joe Chan
 Wong Chi-choi as Mr. Wong
 Lam Chui-fung as Nurse Chow
 Chan Po-chun as Hospital canteen waiter
 Max Yip as Cra driver in accident
 Lai Wing-san as Car passenger in accident
 Cheung Yue-lee as Little boy patient
 Ng Hoi-ying as Little girl patient
 Macy Yik as Little girl patient's mom
 Yiu Nag-si as Nurse
 Oh Ho-yue as Fat nurse
 Chan Man-yiu as Rude passerby in suit
 Wong Wai-chuen as Taxi driver
 Lam Wai-lun as Angel's assistant
 Audrey Mak as Chubs

Awards

See also
 Heaven Can Wait, a 1943 film directed by Ernst Lubitsch
 A Matter of Life and Death, a 1946 film directed by Michael Powell and Emeric Pressburger
 Always, a 1989 film directed by Steven Spielberg
 Ghost, a 1990 film directed by Jerry Zucker

External links
 
 
 HK Cinemagic entry
 loveHKfilm entry

1999 films
1990s romantic fantasy films
Hong Kong romantic fantasy films
1990s Cantonese-language films
Films about blind people
Films set in Hong Kong
Films shot in Hong Kong
1990s Hong Kong films